Williamsiella is a genus of thrips in the family Phlaeothripidae.

Species
 Williamsiella bicoloripes
 Williamsiella brasiliensis
 Williamsiella breviceps
 Williamsiella brevisetis
 Williamsiella capitulatus
 Williamsiella claripes
 Williamsiella fictiopediculus
 Williamsiella insperata
 Williamsiella jacoti
 Williamsiella johanseni
 Williamsiella longiceps
 Williamsiella longisetis
 Williamsiella morgani
 Williamsiella muscoaffinis
 Williamsiella nemoralis
 Williamsiella ocellatus
 Williamsiella pallipes
 Williamsiella pediculus
 Williamsiella perotensis
 Williamsiella tambopata
 Williamsiella texoloensis
 Williamsiella tipitzinus
 Williamsiella totonacapanus
 Williamsiella tricosus
 Williamsiella ventralis
 Williamsiella zaps

References

Phlaeothripidae
Thrips
Thrips genera